Charles Sullivan Perkins (September 9, 1905 – May 25, 1988), nicknamed "Lefty", was a pitcher in Major League Baseball. He pitched for the 1930 Philadelphia Athletics and the 1934 Brooklyn Dodgers. He attended Williams College. His remains were cremated.

References

External links

1905 births
1988 deaths
Baseball players from Birmingham, Alabama
Major League Baseball pitchers
Brooklyn Dodgers players
Philadelphia Athletics players
Williams Ephs baseball players
Vicksburg Hill Billies players
Jersey City Skeeters players
Buffalo Bisons (minor league) players
Baltimore Orioles (IL) players
People from Ensley, Alabama